Borys Rostislavovich Khreschatytsky (1881, Stanitsa Novomykolaivska, Don Host Oblast –1940) was a general of the Russian Empire. He commanded the Ukrainian troops in the Far East (1918–1924).

In January 1918 he arrived in Chita, and later traveled to Kharbin, where he came under the command of General Horvat.  From March 8 to November 14, 1918, he held the position of Chief of Staff of the Russian troops guarding the right-of-way of the Chinese Eastern Railway. In this position, at the beginning of summer 1918, Khreschatytsky began forming the Ukrainian army of the Green Ukraine (Zeleny Klyn). However, when forming the second Ukrainian division, he received an order from Admiral Alexander Kolchak in September 1918 — to send Ukrainian units to an anti-bolshevist front. From November 1918 until August 1919 Khreschatytsky served Kolchak's army, participating in fighting against Soviet Russia and rising to the rank of lieutenant-general. By autumn 1919 he had become inspector of the Far-Eastern formations of strategic reserve and general on the special commissions at commander by the troops of the Priamur's territorial department.

In 1920 Khreschatytsky came under the command of ataman Grigory Semyonov. From April 27, 1920, and to July 7, 1921, he held the position of Chief of Staff of the Cossack troops of the Far East. At the beginning of 1920 (according to other sources - by the summer of 1918) the Ukrainian regional government appointed  Khreschatytsky as commander of the Far-Eastern Ukrainian army. He supported the ideas of ataman G.M. Semyonov on the creation of a single state of Kazaks and Ukrainians in the Far East from Lake Baikal to the Pacific Ocean. From June 26, 1920, there was a manager by the department of foreign affairs of the Zabaykal's government of Semyonov and he negotiated with the Japanese about a joint fight against Red Army. From August, 1921 Khreschatytsky participated in the work of the Supreme Military Soviet of the Zabaykal. After the defeat of the troops (the Far Eastern Army) of General Semyonov and the disbanding in 1920 of the Ukrainian regiments of General L. V. Verigo in Vladivostok, Khreschatytsky  emigrated to Kharbin in Manchuria.

1881 births
1940 deaths
People from Novoazovsk
People from Don Host Oblast
Russian military personnel of World War I
White movement generals
White Russian emigrants to China
Recipients of the Order of St. Anna, 2nd class
Recipients of the Order of St. Anna, 3rd class
Recipients of the Order of St. Anna, 4th class